"Flying High Again" is a song by English heavy metal vocalist Ozzy Osbourne. Released in 1981 from his second album as a solo artist Diary of a Madman (1981). Released as a single, it reached number two on the Billboard Top Tracks chart in 1982.

Although the song has been assumed to be about marijuana use, Osbourne has stated that the song was inspired by his successful re-emergence as a solo artist after being fired from Black Sabbath and subsequently believing his career was over.
The song is in the key of A major.

Gina Boldman of AllMusic praised guitarist Randy Rhoads for the solo in the song as one of his best. She called "Flying High Again"  "A good-time heavy metal song that was hard to take seriously" but "one of Ozzy's most likable and memorable songs of his early-'80s period." In 2015, radio station 100.7 WZLX ranked it the 223rd greatest song.

An animated music video was released to YouTube on 5 November 2021 celebrating guitarist Randy Rhoads, who was killed in an airplane accident a year later following the singles release.

Personnel
Ozzy Osbourne - lead vocals
Randy Rhoads - guitar
Bob Daisley - bass
Lee Kerslake - drums

References

Ozzy Osbourne songs
1981 singles
Songs written by Randy Rhoads
Songs written by Ozzy Osbourne
Songs written by Lee Kerslake
Songs written by Bob Daisley
1981 songs
Jet Records singles
Epic Records singles
British hard rock songs